Hol is a village in Tjeldsund Municipality in Troms og Finnmark county, Norway. The village is located along the Tjeldsundet strait on the northeastern shore of the island of Tjeldøya. Tjeldsund Church is located in this village.

The village was the administrative centre of Tjeldsund until 1 January 2020 when the municipalities of Tjeldsund and Skånland merged and the administrative centre was moved to Evenskjer.

References

Tjeldsund
Villages in Troms